Aaron Kyle Williams is a cartoonist.

Career
Aaron Williams is most famous for his comics Nodwick, PS238 and Full Frontal Nerdity. He also is the creator of Backwards Compatible, a comic on the gaming news website Crispy Gamer.

Hero Games published PS238: The Roleplaying Game (2008), a standalone Hero System game based on the world of Williams' comic of the same name.

He also wrote a Wildstorm series called North 40, with art by Fiona Staples.

In November 2011, DC Comics started producing a 5 issue mini series of Diablo Written by Aaron Williams.

Bibliography
Comics work includes:
Nodwick (script and art, Henchman, January 2000 – September 2006)
PS238 (script and art, Dork Storm Press, December 2002 – July 2009)
Full Frontal Nerdity (script and art, one-shot, Dork Storm Press, November 2004). The strip appears online, and as an extra in PS 238.
Truth, Justin, and the American Way (with co-author Scott Kurtz and art by Giuseppe Ferrario, 5-issue limited series, Image Comics, 2006–2007)
 "Dinner at MacArthur's Cafe" (with art by Casey Jones, in Spider-Man Unlimited No. 13, Marvel Comics, March 2006)
North 40 (with art by Fiona Staples, 6-issue limited series, Wildstorm, July – December 2009)
Diablo (series) (with art and covers by Joseph LaCroix, 5-issue limited series, DC Comics, November 2011 – March 2012

References

External links

Backwards Compatible

Year of birth missing (living people)
Living people
American webcomic creators